Cordelia is an unincorporated community in Hancock County, in the U.S. state of Ohio.

History
A post office was established at Cordelia in 1883, and remained in operation until 1895. William M. McKinley was the first postmaster.

References

Unincorporated communities in Hancock County, Ohio
Unincorporated communities in Ohio